S/S Godthaab (Danish name for Nuuk) was built in 1897–98 at C. Christensen ship yard, Sandefjord, Norway, for the Royal Greenland Trading Department and was the company's first steam ship. The main task for the ship was sailing on the east Greenland settlement Angmassalik (now Tasiilaq) and was built for that purpose with a 240 HP engine and reinforced hull. Godthaab served as base for several expeditions in the Arctic, most notably the expeditions by Lauge Koch between 1926 and 1934. Godthaab sailed for the Royal Greenland Trading Department until it was sold in 1953 to the Faroe Islands. Here it was refitted for herring fishery and renamed Hvitabjørn (polar bear). It was sunk in 1984 after being badly damaged by fire.

The Godthaab expedition 
In 1928 Godthaab undertook a major hydrographical expedition in Baffin Bay and Davis Strait, funded by the Danish Government and the Carlsberg Foundation. This expedition, under the command Eigil Riis-Carstensen, captain in the Royal Danish Navy, studied the oceanography of the Davis Strait and Baffin Bay and closed the last major gap in the surveys of the waters around Greenland. Scientists on the expedition were: Poul Lassenius Kramp (zoology), Paul Marinus Hansen (zoology), Svend Kühnel Hagen (chemistry), Alf Kiilerich (hydrography) and Gunnar Seidenfaden (botany). The expedition completed a number of transects across from the west Greenland Coast to the Canadian coast, sailed 11,000 nautical miles and made measurements at 188 hydrographical stations, down to a maximum depth of 3,500 m. Scientific results of the expedition is described in 37 papers, published under a common heading in the journal Meddelelser om Grønland.

External links 
 http://www.lardex.net/framnesmekverksted/skipstekst/1898godthaap.htm

References 

Research vessels of Denmark
Arctic expeditions
Ships built in Sandefjord
1898 ships